A Superman complex is an unhealthy sense of responsibility, or the belief that everyone else lacks the capacity to successfully perform one or more tasks.  Such a person may feel a constant need to "save" others and, in the process, takes on more work on their own.

The expression seems to have been first been used by Dr. Fredric Wertham in his 1954 book Seduction of the Innocent and his testimony before the Senate Subcommittee on Juvenile Delinquency. His original conceptualization was less about the current allusion to savior complex but was focused more on people's tendency to derive pleasure from a situation where one beats another while they remain as spectators free from physical harm. He claimed that children reading Superman comic books were exposed to "Phantasies of sadistic joy in seeing other people punished over and over again while you yourself remain immune.” In his discourse of the Superman complex, Wertham also blamed comic books for other social issues such as juvenile delinquency, homosexuality, and Communism.

See also
Atlas personality
God complex
Hero syndrome
Messiah complex
Superiority complex

References

Popular psychology
Complex (psychology)